Belokamennaya ("White-stoned") is a station on the Moscow Central Circle, a circular urban rail line integrated with Moscow Metro.

It was opened on 10 September 2016 together with the opening of the Moscow Central Circle. Belokamennaya located between the Rostokino and Bulvar Rokossovskogo platforms. It is located in the Eastern Administrative Okrug on the border of Bogorodskoye and Metrogorodok districts. It is the only railway platform in Moscow located directly on the territory of Losiny Ostrov National Park.

Belokamennaya is the last in popularity out of 31 stations of the Moscow Central Circle. In 2017, the average passenger traffic was approx. 1000 people per day and 38,000 per month; almost the entire traffic is made up of Losiny Ostrov visitors.

Gallery

References

External links 
 Белокаменная mkzd.ru

Moscow Metro stations
Railway stations in Russia opened in 2016
Moscow Central Circle stations